Thomas Faunce (19 March 1883 – 27 May 1968) was an Australian cricketer. He played in four first-class matches for Queensland between 1905 and 1907.

See also
 List of Queensland first-class cricketers

References

External links
 

1883 births
1968 deaths
Australian cricketers
Queensland cricketers
Cricketers from Brisbane